The autocorrelation technique is a method for estimating the dominating frequency in a complex signal, as well as its variance. Specifically, it calculates the first two moments of the power spectrum, namely the mean and variance. It is also known as the pulse-pair algorithm in radar theory.

The algorithm is both computationally faster and significantly more accurate compared to the Fourier transform, since the resolution is not limited by the number of samples used.

Derivation 
The autocorrelation of lag 1 can be expressed using the inverse Fourier transform of the power spectrum :

If we model the power spectrum as a single frequency , this becomes:

where it is apparent that the phase of  equals the signal frequency.

Implementation 
The mean frequency is calculated based on the autocorrelation with lag one, evaluated over a signal consisting of N samples:

The spectral variance is calculated as follows:

Applications 
 Estimation of blood velocity and turbulence in color flow imaging used in medical ultrasonography.
 Estimation of target velocity in pulse-doppler radar

External links 
 A covariance approach to spectral moment estimation, Miller et al., IEEE Transactions on Information Theory. 
 Doppler Radar Meteorological Observations Doppler Radar Theory. Autocorrelation technique described on p.2-11
 Real-Time Two-Dimensional Blood Flow Imaging Using an Autocorrelation Technique, by Chihiro Kasai, Koroku Namekawa, Akira Koyano, and Ryozo Omoto, IEEE Transactions on Sonics and Ultrasonics, Vol. SU-32, No.3, May 1985.

Radar theory
Signal processing
Autocorrelation